Emericellopsis is a genus of fungi in the order Hypocreales. The relationship of this taxon to other taxa within the order is unknown (incertae sedis), and it has not yet been placed with certainty into any family.

Species
Emericellopsis alkalina 
Emericellopsis cladophorae 
Emericellopsis donezkii 
Emericellopsis enteromorphae 
Emericellopsis glabra 
Emericellopsis humicola 
Emericellopsis koreana 
Emericellopsis maritima 
Emericellopsis microspora 
Emericellopsis minima 
Emericellopsis mirabilis 
Emericellopsis pallida 
Emericellopsis persica 
Emericellopsis phycophila 
Emericellopsis pusilla 
Emericellopsis robusta 
Emericellopsis salmosynnemata 
Emericellopsis sphaerospora 
Emericellopsis stolkiae 
Emericellopsis synnematicola 
Emericellopsis terricola

References

Sordariomycetes genera
Hypocreales incertae sedis
Taxa described in 1840